Deveboynu may refer to the following places in Turkey:

 Deveboynu, Beşiri
 Deveboynu, Çüngüş
 Cape Deveboynu, Datça